The Black Hills are a mountain range in Contra Costa County, California.

References 

Mountain ranges of the San Francisco Bay Area
Mountain ranges of Contra Costa County, California
Mountain ranges of Northern California